Koma Dengê Azadî (Voice of Liberty), formed in Istanbul in 1990, was one of the most popular and longest-running Kurdish bands in Turkey. Like other Kurdish bands of the 90's, Koma Dengê Azadî adopted a style which was completely new for the Kurdish music scene, reinterpreting  traditional Kurdish Music in a modern form with particular appeal to a young generation of urban Kurds and Turks. They also performed Kurdish translations of international songs such as "Bella Ciao".

Between 1991 and 1998, Koma Dengê Azadî has released four albums, all of which were at one point banned by the state. Despite the bans several hundred thousand copies of the albums were sold. Despite many of their concerts being banned in Turkey, they remained popular there and also gave numerous concerts in Germany, Belgium, Netherlands and United Kingdom.

Songs 
Some of the most popular songs of this band are the following:
 Roj roja me ye
 Newroz tê
 Tew gulê narê
 No çi halo
 Selo
 Gul û xwîn
 Fedî
 Dilê xemgîn
 Dere sorê
 Lêlê Bejnê
 Dikim herim eskeriyê (Hat karwanê Helebê)

Albums 
 Hêvî (Hope), 1991
 Em Azadîxwaz in (We are liberty-loving), 1993
 Welatê min/Roj wê bê (My homeland), 1995
 Fedî (Shame), 1998

Members 
 Dilek
 İbrahim Erdem
 Ömer Avcı
 Serhat Karakas
 Nuri Erdem
 Serhat Baran
 Mehmet Atlı
 Sema Yiğit
 Ece Güner
 I. Halil Yıldız
 Hakan Ener

References

Additional Sources 
 Guner, Hasan (2007):"Kom'lar ve Kürt müzigi". In: Esmer Dergisi, 05.2007, Istanbul
 Kurdish Wikipedia
 Kurdshow.com
 Kurdish magazin
 Musika Kurdi, Lyrics of Koma Denge Azadi
 Cafrande.org

Kurdish musical groups